I Promise also known as the MySpace Album is a 2006 album by Chinese-American rapper Jin. It was released on November 1, 2006

Background
It is his third official CD and was sold through MySpace.com only. It became available on November 1 to November 27 for his fans on MySpace. People who ordered the album on those days got the album just in time for Christmas and specially autographed by Jin himself writing "PEACE JIN". It was then sold on CDBaby.com with limited copies being pressed and not autographed for people who were unable to purchase it before. Jin claims his reasons for selling it through MySpace only is because people don't buy CDs in the stores anymore. On top of that he wanted to avoid the hassles of putting the record in stores and get it to the public before the end of 2006. The first single from the CD is "36-24-36 (Applebottom Jeans)" and the project was executive produced by Roy P. Perez© .

Track listing

References

External links
 cdbaby.com

2006 albums
MC Jin albums